The Caucasian mole (Talpa caucasica) is a mammal in the family Talpidae that is endemic to the Caucasus Mountains of Russia and Georgia. 

Ognev's mole (T. ognevi) was formerly classified as a subspecies, but is now thought to be a distinct species.

References

Talpa
Mammals of Russia
Fauna of Georgia (country)
Mammals described in 1908
Taxa named by Konstantin Satunin
Taxonomy articles created by Polbot